The Men's Shot Put event at the 2011 All-Africa Games took place on 12 September at the Estádio Nacional do Zimpeto.

Medalists

Records
Prior to the competition, the established records were as follows.

The games record was broken by gold medalist.

Schedule

Results

Final

References

External links

Shot put